Hürkuş: Göklerdeki Kahraman is a 2018 historical drama film directed by Kudret Sabancı.

Cast 

 Hilmi Cem İntepe (Vecihi Hürkuş)
 Gizem Karaca (Hadiye)
 Miray Daner
 Bora Akkaş
 Zeyno Eracar
 Murat Arkın
 Bahadır Yenişehiroğlu
 Ali Nur Türkoğlu
 Birol Ünel
 Cem Uçan
 Eray Türk
 Efecan Dianzenza
 Gurur Aydoğan
 Hakan Yufkacıgül
 Levent Can
 Perihan Ünlücan
 Rıza Akın

References

External links
 

2018 films
2018 drama films
2010s historical drama films
Turkish historical drama films
Turkish aviation films